Business Today is an Asian-Pacific television program, which began airing on the Asia-pacific channel Australia Network in August 2006, and on ABC News 24 (Australia) on 23 July 2010. It is hosted by Whitney Fitzsimmons. The program provides daily rundowns of Australian, Australasian, and International economies, as well as commentaries on financial and political outcomes.

Australian Broadcasting Corporation original programming
Australian television news shows
2006 Australian television series debuts
2010s Australian television series